Mountain grevillea may refer to:
Grevillea alpina
Grevillea montanaGrevillea victoriae''

Grevillea taxa by common name